Marvin Emil Panch (May 28, 1926December 31, 2015) was an American stock car racing driver. Winner of the 1961 Daytona 500 and 1966 World 600, he won seventeen NASCAR Grand National Series events during a 17-year career.

Early career
Born in Menomonie, Wisconsin, Panch relocated to California at an early age. He started his racing career as a car owner in Oakland, California. One week, his driver did not show up, and he raced the car to a third-place finish. He won a championship and several races in six years, including five NASCAR races on the West Coast of the United States.

NASCAR career
He attempted his first East Coast race at Darlington Raceway in 1953. NASCAR founder Bill France, Sr. convinced him to come east for 1954. Lee Petty invited Panch to race in the 1954 Darlington race, where he finished third. The finish impressed Tom Horbison, who hired Panch to race his car during the 1955 season. His 1955 finishes caught the attention of  Pete DePaolo, who hired Panch to race in his factory Ford team. Panch won his first NASCAR race on July 20, 1956, at Montgomery Speedway after starting on the pole position and dominating the entire race.

He won the two races in 1957 for DePaolo. He added another victory in April before Ford ended its factory support in the middle of the season. Panch joined the legendary Holman-Moody team for the rest of the season. He won three more events in the season and finished second in the final points standings.

The end of the Ford factory sponsorship hurt Panch's career. Over the next three seasons, he was only able to race in 24 races.

He was offered a ride by famed NASCAR mechanic Smokey Yunick in the 1961 Daytona 500. The car was a year old (1960) Pontiac. Panch took the offer and won the 1961 Daytona 500 to put his career back on track. During the 1962 season he was offered a ride by renowned car owners the Wood Brothers. He accepted the ride in the Ford factory-sponsored team. Panch had eight wins and 30 top-three finishes in 69 races for the team. He stayed with the team from 1962 to March 27, 1966, when Ford had another dispute with NASCAR.  In 1965, A. J. Foyt finished the Atlanta 500 at Atlanta Motor Speedway in a car Panch had started, taking it to victory.  Panch received credit for the win.

In February 1963 Panch was involved in a fiery crash at Daytona and was pulled to safety by a fellow driver Tiny Lund. Lund was awarded the Carnegie Medal for heroism and went on to win the 1963 Daytona 500 in the car that the injured Panch had been scheduled to drive.  Lund said of Panch:  "Marvin would have done the same for us."

Panch was hired by Petty to race for Petty Enterprises for the 1966 World 600 in a year old car. Panch won the race for his final career victory when Petty was his relief driver. Panch raced for Petty Enterprises until he announced his retirement after the National 500 at Charlotte in October 1966.

Awards
Panch was named one of NASCAR's 50 Greatest Drivers in 1998. He was inducted into the National Motorsports Press Association Hall of Fame in 1987, and the West Coast Stock Car Hall of Fame in its first class in 2002.

Personal life
His second wife Bettie founded the Women's Auxiliary of Motorsports. Panch is the father of four children: Pamela and Marvann, from his first marriage to Hester Herrald, and Richard (deceased) and Marvette, from his second marriage to Bettie Gong.

Following his Daytona 500 win, Panch purchased property in Port Orange, Florida, relocating there after the end of his career. On December 31, 2015, Panch was found unconscious in his car, and was later pronounced dead of natural causes.

Motorsports career results

NASCAR
(key) (Bold – Pole position awarded by qualifying time. Italics – Pole position earned by points standings or practice time. * – Most laps led.)

Grand National Series

Daytona 500

References

External links

Réplica del Histórico Auto

1926 births
2015 deaths
People from Menomonie, Wisconsin
Sportspeople from Oakland, California
Racing drivers from Wisconsin
NASCAR drivers